Flutrimazole is a wide-spectrum antifungal drug. It is used for the topical treatment of superficial mycoses of the skin. Flutrimazole is an imidazole derivative. Its antifungal activity has been demonstrated in in vivo and in vitro studies to be comparable to that of clotrimazole and higher than bifonazole.

Mechanism of action
It interferes with the synthesis of ergosterol by inhibiting the activity of the enzyme lanosterol 14 α-demethylase.

See also 
 Clotrimazole

References 
The Merck Index, 12th Edition. 4247

Fluoroarenes
Imidazole antifungals
Lanosterol 14α-demethylase inhibitors